The Ray Bryant Touch is a live album by pianist Ray Bryant recorded in Los Angeles and released by Sue Records in 1967.

Track listing 
All compositions by Ray Bryant except where noted
 "Little Susie" – 5:00
 "This Is All I Ask" (Gordon Jenkins) – 5:38
 "City Tribal Dance" – 2:27
 "Prayer Song" – 4:02
 "You Keep Me Hangin' On" (Brian Holland, Lamont Dozier, Eddie Holland) – 6:06
 "Talkin' My Ease" – 5:20
 "And I Love Her" (John Lennon, Paul McCartney) – 7:30

Personnel 
Ray Bryant – piano
Jimmy Rowser – bass
Rudy Collins – drums

References 

1967 live albums
Ray Bryant live albums
Cadet Records live albums
Albums produced by Esmond Edwards